The following is a list of winners of the Golden Calf for best montage at the NFF. This category has been awarded since 2003.

 2021 Marc Bechtold - The Forgotten Battle
 2020 Ruben van der Hammen - Ze noemen me Baboe
 2019 Menno Boerema - The Miracle of the Little Prince
 2018 Wouter van Luijn - Wij
 2017 Sander Vos - Tonio
 2016 Sander Vos - Full Contact
 2015 Mieneke Kramer - Prins
 2014 Boudewijn Koole - Happily Ever After
 2013 Katharina Wartena - Boven is het stil
 2012 JP Luijsterburg - The Heineken Kidnapping
 2011 Sander Vos - Black Butterflies
 2010 Job ter Burg - Tirza
 2009 Esther Rots - Can Go Through Skin
 2008 Robert Jan Westdijk - In Real Life
 2007 Herman P. Koerts - Kruistocht In Spijkerbroek
 2006 Menno Boerema, Albert Elings, Eugenie Jansen & Chris van Oers - Jungle Rudy, Kroniek Van Een Familie
 2005 Sander Vos - Paradise Now
 2004 Mario Steenbergen - The Last Victory
 2003 Peter Alderliesten - Phileine Zegt Sorry

Sources
 Golden Calf Awards (Dutch)
 NFF Website

Best Montage
Film editing awards